Oederastria is a monotypic moth genus of the family Noctuidae. Its only species, Oederastria ectorhoda, is found in Zimbabwe. Both the genus and species were first described by George Hampson in 1902.

References

Endemic fauna of Zimbabwe
Acontiinae
Monotypic moth genera